Oak Mountain may refer to:

 Oak Mountain (Missouri), a summit in Missouri
 Oak Mountain State Park, a southern spur of the Appalachian Mountains in Shelby County, Alabama, home to Double Oak mountain
 Oak Mountain High School, in Birmingham, Alabama
 Oak Mountain Amphitheatre, formerly known as the Verizon Wireless Music Center, Pelham, Alabama
 The original name of Mount Lowe in California
 Oak Mountain (Herkimer County, New York), a summit located in Central New York
 Oak Mountain (Riverside County)